Sofades is a town and municipality in Thessaly, central Greece belonging to the regional unit of Karditsa. Its 2011 census population was 6,056 people and 18,864 for the municipality, including a large Romani community. Its elevation is around 120 m above sea level, and the economy is mainly agricultural (cotton, corn).  It is the only municipality that has one municipal district with settlements. Sofades is located south of Palamas, southwest of Larissa, the capital of Thessaly, northwest of Lamia and southeast of Karditsa and Trikala.  Sofades is on GR-30 (Karditsa - Domokos - Volos) as well as the road between Mataragka and Palamas. It is on the OSE railway line linking Kalambaka and the main line and has a station. The native Greek inhabitants of the region are commonly known as Karagounides (Καραγκούνηδες).

History
The modern town is very close to the site of the ancient city of Kierion or Cierium, one of the most important cities of ancient Thessaly. The name "Sofades" was first recorded as "Sofou" (Σοφού) around 1454 AD. In the early 1800s the English traveler William Martin Leake described the town as an administrative center consisting of around 150 houses and belonging to Abdim Bey of Larissa, but paying a yearly tribute to Ali Pasha. Chief crops of the region were corn and sesame, from which the oil was a major product. 

Much of the area is hilly and consists of farmland and woodland. Mountains lie to the south and east.  A river flows to the north.

Municipality
The municipality Sofades was formed at the 2011 local government reform by the merger of the following 5 former municipalities, that became municipal units:
Arni
Menelaida
Rentina
Sofades
Tamasio

The municipality has an area of 720.752 km2, the municipal unit 241.255 km2.

Subdivisions
The municipal unit of Sofades is divided into the following communities:
Agia Paraskevi
Agios Vissarios
Ampelos
Anogeio
Dasochori
Filia
Gefyria
Kappadokiko
Karpochori
Mascholouri
Melissochori
Paschalitsa
Sofades (Sofades, Tavropos)

Population

Transport
The town is served by Sofades railway station, with services to Palaiofarsalos, Larissa, Thessaloniki, Kalambaka & Athens.

References

External links
 Official website (in Greek)

Cities in ancient Greece
Populated places in Karditsa (regional unit)
Municipalities of Thessaly